Sonia Fares is a fashion designer and former Miss Lebanon who participated in Miss Universe 1968.

Biography
Sonia Fares was born on September 6, 1949, in Lebanon. She is a native to Beirut, Lebanon. Her father's name is Gerges Fares and her mother's name is Iman Attieh. She is also the mother of Rasha Chammas who is a photographer. She currently resides in a Paris suburb known as Neuilly-sur-Seine.

Education
Sonia Fares studied fine arts in Lebanon, and she then went on to study fashion in London.

Career
Sonia Fares is currently a fashion designer. She was a former Miss Lebanon in the year of 1967. She was the owner of her boutique called "Sonia Fares." It was located in the Parisian golden triangle at the Rue Du Boccador. She is recorded to be a supporter of anything entailed to arts and culture.

References

1949 births
Living people
Lebanese fashion designers
Lebanese beauty pageant winners
Artists from Beirut
People from Neuilly-sur-Seine
Lebanese emigrants to France
Lebanese women fashion designers
Miss Universe 1968 contestants
Miss World 1967 delegates